A priority call is a telephone call that has been assigned some enhanced level of priority for processing by a telecommunications network such that it may be expected to achieve precedence over other traffic. In a given network, there may be several levels of priority.

Priority call, and priority ring are also brand names of calling features which give a distinctive ring to calls from telephone numbers chosen by the subscriber and which require a subscription from their local telephone company. To set up priority call, one dials *61 and follows the instructions. To disable priority call, one dials *81.

See also 

 Enhanced 911
 Message precedence

References 

Calling features
Teletraffic